The Mayor of Porto Alegre, Brazil, is the Chief Executive of the city. The mayor is elected for a four-year term, limited to one re-election. Mayoral activities are regulated by Sections IV, V, VI, Chapter VI of Porto Alegre City Charter. Current mayor is Nelson Marchezan Júnior; he is the 37th mayor of Porto Alegre.

Porto Alegre City Charter provides a succession line for any case of office vacancy. The first in line is the Deputy Mayor of Porto Alegre (who is elected in the same ticket of the Mayor), next is the Speaker of Porto Alegre City Council and, lastly, the Porto Alegre Attorney-General.

Duties of the Mayor of Porto Alegre
Section V, Chapter VI enumerates duties of the Mayor of Porto Alegre. In general, the mayor has broad powers over Porto Alegre's bureaucracy, as Porto Alegre is set up to be in a strong mayor-council type of government. These are the duties of the Mayor of Porto Alegre, as set forth by Article 94, Section V, Chapter VI of Porto Alegre City Charter:
Appoint and dismiss Secretaries, Directors of the several Departments, and everyone in charge of Porto Alegre's public bodies
Sign into law bills passed by Porto Alegre City Council, enacting ordinances for execution of several Acts of City Council
Veto bills passed by City Council
Disposal of municipal administration
Dispose on civil servants, except for those under jurisdiction of City Council
Report annually to City Council on public works
Sponsor bills whose purposes are
Hiring of new servants, pay rises
Legal situation of civil servants
Creation and management of bodies under Mayor's jurisdiction
Reply, no later than 45 days after filing, to questions raised by City Council and several other bodies
Stand for Porto Alegre
Take loans with prior City Council approval
Issue condemnation orders
Propose selling or leasing of government-owned assets with City Council approval
Propose deals, agreements beneficial for Porto Alegre
Propose administrative division of Porto Alegre
Bring lawsuits disputing constitutionality of Acts
Buy stocks, raise capital for public-owned enterprises
Declare state of emergency
Nominate NGOs for supervision alongside government entities
Reply, no later than 45 days after filing, about feasibility of bills

List of mayors of Porto Alegre

See also
 Government of Porto Alegre
 
 Timeline of Porto Alegre
 List of mayors of largest cities in Brazil (in Portuguese)
 List of mayors of capitals of Brazil (in Portuguese)

Notes
 "Galeria dos Ex-Prefeitos." Prefeitura de Porto Alegre. 16 Sept. 2006 <http://www2.portoalegre.rs.gov.br/infocidade/default.php?p_secao=23>.
Lei Orgânica - Atualizada Até  Emenda Nº 24 (Emenda Nº 23 Em Anexo)." Câmara Municipal de Porto Alegre. 16 Sept. 2006 <http://www.camarapoa.rs.gov.br/biblioteca/integrais/LOMatualizadaatéEmenda24_Emenda23emAnexo.htm>.

External links
José Fogaça, Mayor of Porto Alegre
Commenting on José Fogaça, Mayor of Porto Alegre
Porto Alegre City Hall
Porto Alegre City Council

Porto Alegre